The reward theory of attraction claims that people are attracted to individuals exhibiting behaviors that are rewarding to them or whom they associate with rewarding events. Individuals seek to develop strong relationships with those who provide positive and fulfilling interactions that require little to nothing in return.

Effects on attraction

According to the reward theory, people are attracted to those that they find it satisfying and gratifying to be with. The reward theory also helps explain why people are more attracted to people who they are in close proximity to, who are more physically attractive, who are more like them, or who reciprocate their feelings. According to reward theory, proximity is rewarding. One example is because living or working nearby is less costly. People like attractive people because they perceive that attractive people offer other desirable traits, and they benefit from associating with them. This is known as the physical attractiveness stereotype.

Original research

Pawel Lewicki (1985)
Conditioning creates positive feelings towards things and people linked with rewarding events. Pawel Lewicki in 1985 tested this liking-by-association principle by conducting an experiment on students at the University of Warsaw.  In the experiment, two pictures, both of women, were given to the students. The students had to choose which of two pictured women (woman A or woman B) looked friendlier to them. The results showed that an equal amount of students each choose the picture of woman A and woman B to be friendlier. The students in the group who choose woman A, interacted with a warm and friendly experimenter who resembled woman A before choosing a picture. They ended up choosing woman A at a margin of 6 to 1. In a follow up study, the experimenter acted unfriendly toward half of the participants. When these participants later had to choose out of the two pictures, they almost always avoided the one who looked like the "unfriendly" experimenter.

Griffit (1970)
In Griffit's study college students that evaluated strangers in a pleasant room liked them better than students who evaluated strangers in an uncomfortably hot room.

Recent research

Helen Fisher (Yale University)
Helen Fisher and colleagues conducted a neuroimaging study on men and women that had just "fallen madly in love".  Using functional magnetic resonance imaging (fMRI), they collected data on 10 women and 7 men that reported being in love an average of 7.4 months.  Each participant was shown a picture of their loved one as well as a photograph of an emotionally neutral person, each viewing was then followed by a distraction task to cleanse the mind of strong emotions.  Brain activation with the picture of the loved one was high in the region of the brain that produces and distributes dopamine and also brains "reward system", or the neural network associated with pleasure, arousal, focus, and motivation.

Gingrich, Liu, Cascio, Wang, and Insel (2000)
In the year 2000, animal studies were conducted in which attraction is positively  associated with elevated activity in central dopamine. In the experiment, a female lab-raised prairie vole was mated with a male, and formed a distinct preference for him associated with a 50% increase of dopamine. When a dopamine antagonist was injected into the reward region of the brain, she no longer had the preference for the male.

Helen Fisher (2005)
In 2005 Fisher and colleagues conducted a second fMRI study in which participants were still in love with a past partner.  The study included 10 women and 5 men.  The rejected participants viewed pictures of their ex and of a similar, emotionally neutral individual.  Within the participants dopamine was again increased with viewing of the photographs.

References 

Interpersonal attraction
Philosophy of love
Psychological theories